Fredrik Krekula (born April 8, 1974) is a Swedish professional ice hockey player currently with the Skellefteå AIK of Elitserien.

External links

References 

1974 births
Swedish ice hockey left wingers
AIK IF players
Skellefteå AIK players
Living people